Lexi Fernandez (born January 5, 1995) is a Filipina actress, host, singer and dancer.

Career
Lexi, who got her mestiza looks from her mother Maritoni who is half-English with some Irish roots, decided to follow in her mother's footsteps by pursuing an acting career under GMA Network and was seen regularly on several of the network's shows.

She retired from showbiz in 2015 as she was suffering from anxiety and depression for 2 years prior.

Personal life
She is the daughter of Maritoni Fernandez, a Filipina actress.

Filmography

Film

Television

Awards and nominations

References

1995 births
Living people
Filipino child actresses
Filipino people of English descent
Filipino people of Irish descent
Filipino television actresses
Actresses from Manila
21st-century Filipino actresses
GMA Network personalities